Grant Municipal Airport  is a city-owned, public-use airport located two nautical miles (4 km) north of the central business district of Grant, a city in Perkins County, Nebraska, United States. It is included in the National Plan of Integrated Airport Systems for 2011–2015, which categorized it as a general aviation airport.

Although many U.S. airports use the same three-letter location identifier for the FAA and IATA, this facility is assigned GGF by the FAA but has no designation from the IATA.

Facilities and aircraft 
Grant Municipal Airport covers an area of 95 acres (38 ha) at an elevation of 3,425 feet (1,044 m) above mean sea level. It has one runway designated 15/33 with a concrete surface measuring 4,797 by 60 feet (1,462 x 18 m).

For the 12-month period ending June 30, 2009, the airport had 9,500 general aviation aircraft operations, an average of 26 per day. At that time there were 14 aircraft based at this airport, all single-engine.

References

External links 
 Aerial image as of May 1999 from USGS The National Map
 
 

Airports in Nebraska
Buildings and structures in Perkins County, Nebraska